Canadians in Lebanon consists mostly of Canadians of Lebanese origin who returned to the country as well as expatriates from Canada. According to Canada's Department of Foreign Affairs and International Trade, there are about 45,000 Canadians living in Lebanon

History
In the 1980s, thousands of Lebanese fled their country during the Lebanese Civil War and settled in Canada. With the return of relative stability to the country in recent years, it has become increasingly common for members of Canada's Lebanese community to return to their homeland, most commonly for summer vacations, but also to take up residence. Most of these returnees have dual Canadian-Lebanese citizenship.

2006 Lebanon War

Many Canadians left Lebanon and returned to Canada in the wake of the 2006 Lebanon War as their houses and businesses have been destroyed during the conflict and they have no resources.

See also
 Lebanese Canadian
 Canada–Lebanon relations

References

Ethnic groups in Lebanon
 
Lebanon
Canada–Lebanon relations
Ethnic groups in the Middle East